Time Pilot '84: Further Into Unknown World is a scrolling multidirectional shooter released in arcades in 1984 by Konami. The different time periods of  1982's Time Pilot are replaced by a top-down view of a science fiction landscape that varies in color and type of enemies. It adds the ability for the player to launch guided missiles. Time Pilot '84 was primarily sold as a conversion kit for older games.

Gameplay
The first button is used to fire a standard shot, which can destroy green-colored enemies. The second button is used to fire missiles, which can destroy the silver-colored enemies. The player needs to lock on to a silver enemy to fire missiles at it. Destroying enough green enemies brings out a large, silver boss enemy that must be dispatched before advancing to the next level.

Reception 
In Japan, Game Machine listed Time Pilot '84 on their August 15, 1984 issue as being the eleventh most-successful table arcade unit of the month.

Legacy
Time Pilot '84 was cloned for the Commodore 64 as Space-Pilot II released by Kingsoft in 1985. The first Space-Pilot was a clone of Time Pilot.

Time Pilot '84 was re-released for Nintendo Switch on May 27, 2021 as part of the Arcade Archives series.

References

External links

Time Pilot '84 at the Arcade History database

1984 video games
Konami games
Arcade video games
Arcade-only video games
Multidirectional shooters
Scrolling shooters
Konami arcade games
Video games developed in Japan